Virginie Dreux is a French Paralympic athlete who competes in international level events. She mainly competes in heptathlon events at INAS competitions and also competed in long jump events at the 2012 IPC Athletics European Championships and 2013 IPC Athletics World Championships.

References

1988 births
Living people
Sportspeople from Angers
Paralympic athletes of France
French female hurdlers
French female long jumpers
French heptathletes
People with epilepsy